Skadanščina is a small village in the Municipality of Hrpelje-Kozina in the Littoral region of Slovenia close to the border with Croatia.

Mass grave
Skadanščina is the site of a mass grave associated with the Second World War. The Bukovje Cave Mass Grave is located south-southwest of the village. It contains the remains of 12 German SS members.

Church
The local church is dedicated to Saint Roch and belongs to the Parish of Slivje.

References

External links

Skadanščina on Geopedia

Populated places in the Municipality of Hrpelje-Kozina